Benno Vigny (real name Benoit Philippe Weinfeld; 28 October 1889 – 31 October 1965) was a French-German novelist  and screenwriter.

Life and works 
Vigny was born in Commercy and grew up in Vienna. He moved to Berlin in the 1920s. There he began working as a screenwriter in collaboration with other writers, particularly for German-British co-productions.

In 1927, his novel Amy Jolly, die Frau aus Marrakesch (Amy Jolly, the Woman from Marrakesh) was published, which became the 1930 film  Morocco in the USA, in which Marlene Dietrich made her Hollywood debut. Another novel, Nell John. Der Roman einer Verjüngten (Nell John, The Tale of a Rejuvenated Woman), also appeared in 1927.

At the beginning of the 1930s, Vigny went to Paris, where he continued to collaborate as a screenwriter for international co-productions. The little-known film Bariole, from this period, is his only work as a film director.

After this period, Vigny worked only occasionally as a screenwriter. His last screenplay was the critically acclaimed Der Verlorene   (The Lost One) (1951), co-written with Peter Lorre, who also directed and acted in the film.

He died in Munich.

Filmography 
Ssanin (dir. Friedrich Feher, 1924)
Ghost Train (dir. Géza von Bolváry, 1927)
Knights of the Night (dir. Max Reichmann, 1928)
Number 17 (dir. Géza von Bolváry, 1928)
The Wrecker (dir. Géza von Bolváry, 1929)
Tonka of the Gallows (dir. Karl Anton, 1930)
Morocco (dir. Josef von Sternberg, 1930)
A Girl from the Reeperbahn (dir. Karl Anton, 1930)
The Indictment (dir. Dimitri Buchowetzki, 1931) - French-language version of Manslaughter (1930)
Reckless Youth (dir. Leo Mittler, 1931) - German-language version of Manslaughter (1930)
 The Case of Colonel Redl (dir. Karl Anton, 1931)
The Rebel (1931) (dir. Adelqui Migliar, 1931) - French-language version of The Virtuous Sin (1930)
 The Night of Decision (dir. Dimitri Buchowetzki, 1931) - German-language version of The Virtuous Sin (1930)
Rive gauche (dir. Alexander Korda, 1931) - French-language version of Laughter (1930)
Lo mejor es reir (dir. Florián Rey and E. W. Emo, 1931) - Spanish-language version of Laughter (1930)
The Men Around Lucy (dir. Alexander Korda, 1931) - German-language version of Laughter (1930)
Côte d'Azur (dir. Roger Capellani, 1932)
Transit Camp (dir. Max Reichmann, 1932)
Baroud (dir. Rex Ingram and Alice Terry, 1932)
Bariole (dir. Benno Vigny, 1934)
Odette (dir. Jacques Houssin and Giorgio Zambon, 1934)
Parisian Life (dir. Robert Siodmak, 1936)
Barry (dir. Richard Pottier, 1949)
The Trip to Marrakesh (dir. Richard Eichberg, 1949)
Vienna Waltzes (dir. Emil-Edwin Reinert, 1951)
The Lost One (dir. Peter Lorre, 1951)

References

Bibliography 
Kay Weniger, Das große Personenlexikon des Films, Volume 8, Berlin: Schwarzkopf & Schwarzkopf, 2001,  
Jean-Pascal Constantin, Benno VIGNY, Les Gens du Cinéma, 14 September 2004

External links 

1889 births
1965 deaths
People from Commercy
19th-century French Jews
German male screenwriters
German male novelists
20th-century German novelists
French military personnel of World War I
20th-century German male writers
Film people from Vienna
20th-century German screenwriters
French emigrants to Germany